Maurice Neubauer (born 29 April 1996) is a German professional footballer who plays as a left-back for  club SV Elversberg.

References

External links
 

1996 births
Living people
People from Recklinghausen
Sportspeople from Münster (region)
Footballers from North Rhine-Westphalia
German footballers
Association football defenders
FC Schalke 04 II players
1. FSV Mainz 05 II players
FC 08 Homburg players
SV Elversberg players
3. Liga players
Regionalliga players